According the Somalian government, in 2020, child marriages in Somalia, known to deprive women of opportunities to reach their full potential, have among women aged 20-24, 36 percent of total population. 

The quantity was reduced since, in 2017, 45% of girls were married off before 18 years old, and 8% are married before they turn 15.

References 

Somalia
Childhood in Africa
Society of Somalia
Marriage in Africa